The Texas Rangers is a 1951 American Western film shot in SuperCinecolor directed by Phil Karlson and starring George Montgomery and Gale Storm.

Plot
Outlaw Sam Bass terrorizes Texas. Johnny Carver and Buff Smith are released from jail by the head of the Texas Rangers to help capture him. The jailbirds appear to be planning a double cross in league with the outlaws, until the big hold-up of a gold train when they play on the Rangers' side.

Cast
 George Montgomery as Johnny Carver
 Gale Storm as Helen Fenton
 Jerome Courtland as Danny Bonner 
 Noah Beery Jr. as Buff Smith
 William Bishop as Sam Bass
 John Litel as Major John B. Jones, head of Texas Rangers
 Douglas Kennedy as Dave Rudabaugh
 John Dehner as John Wesley Hardin
 Ian Macdonald as the Sundance Kid
 John Doucette as Butch Cassidy
 Jock O'Mahoney as Duke Fisher
 Charles Trowbridge as Texas Governor (uncredited)

Production
George Montgomery had previously made two Westerns for Edward Small. The film was produced by Small's son Bernard. The railroad scenes were filmed on the Sierra Railroad in Tuolumne County, California.

See also
 List of American films of 1951

References

External links

1951 films
American Western (genre) films
1951 Western (genre) films
Films directed by Phil Karlson
Columbia Pictures films
Films about the Texas Ranger Division
Films adapted into comics
Films produced by Edward Small
Cultural depictions of Butch Cassidy and the Sundance Kid
American black-and-white films
Cinecolor films
1950s English-language films
1950s American films
Films with screenplays by Richard Schayer
Films shot in California